Laxmipur Patari (Nepali: लक्ष्मीपुर पतारी ) is a Rural municipality in Siraha District in Province No. 2 of Nepal. It was formed in 2016 occupying current 5 sections (wards) from previous 5 former VDCs. It occupies an area of 42.33 sq. km with a total population of 26,913.

References

Rural municipalities in Madhesh Province
Rural municipalities of Nepal established in 2017